Barygnathella is a genus of moths belonging to the subfamily Tortricinae of the family Tortricidae.

Species
Barygnathella acrogonia (Diakonoff, 1954)
Barygnathella anthracospila (Diakonoff, 1954)
Barygnathella argentea (Diakonoff, 1954)
Barygnathella bathyglypha (Diakonoff, 1951)
Barygnathella caryotrota (Meyrick, 1938)
Barygnathella centripeta Diakonoff, 1973
Barygnathella chrysauges (Diakonoff, 1954)
Barygnathella diagrapha Diakonoff, 1973
Barygnathella glaucops (Diakonoff, 1954)
Barygnathella lithodes (Diakonoff, 1954)
Barygnathella olivacea (Diakonoff, 1954)
Barygnathella ophiodora (Diakonoff, 1954)
Barygnathella orphnina (Diakonoff, 1954)
Barygnathella phanerosema Diakonoff, 1972
Barygnathella plagiozona Diakonoff, 1972
Barygnathella polystalagma (Diakonoff, 1954)
Barygnathella prosecta Diakonoff, 1972
Barygnathella psorospora Diakonoff, 1973
Barygnathella pulverulosa Diakonoff, 1972
Barygnathella rhodantha (Diakonoff, 1954)
Barygnathella seriographa Diakonoff, 1974
Barygnathella subtilis (Diakonoff, 1954)
Barygnathella teratographa (Diakonoff, 1954)
Barygnathella triangulum (Diakonoff, 1954)
Barygnathella tricolor (Diakonoff, 1944)
Barygnathella virens (Diakonoff, 1954)

See also
List of Tortricidae genera

References

External links
tortricidae.com

Tortricidae genera